Longiflagrum is an estuarine genus of crustacean in the order Tanaidacea.

Ecology 
All five Longiflagrum species occur in shallow coastal habitats such as the intertidal zone, eelgrass beds and estuaries where the salinity fluctuates over the range 5–34 psu, and they are a frequent and abundant element of the soft-bottom ecosystem.

References

External links 
 

Tanaidacea
Crustaceans of Australia
Crustaceans described in 1995